Nossa Senhora da Conceição was launched at Lisbon on 13 July 1771 for the Portuguese Navy as a first rate ship of the line of 90 guns. In 1793 she was the flagship of the squadron that the Portuguese Navy provided to assist the British Royal Navy's Channel Fleet. The next year the Portuguese government refitted her and changed her name to Príncipe Real. In 1798-1800 Príncipe Real served in the Mediterranean as the flagship of the Portuguese squadron assisting Admiral Nelson.

In mid-September 1798, a squadron of Portuguese ships arrived at Malta during the two-year British siege. The Portuguese squadron included Príncipe Real (90; Captain Puysigur), Rainha de Portugal (74; Captain Thomas Stone), São Sebastião (74; Captain Mitchell), Afonso de Albuquerque (64; Captain Donald Campbell), and the brig Falcão (24; Captain Duncan). Four of the captains were British, and all were under the command of Domingos Xavier de Lima, Marquess of Niza. In addition, the British ship  (Captain Manley Dixon) and the fireship  (Captain George Baker) were attached to the squadron. The Portuguese government had sent this force from the Tagus to augment Nelson's fleet. After a brief stay off Malta the squadron continued to Alexandria. There Nelson sent the squadron back to blockade Malta.

 departed Naples on 6 August 1799, in company with the frigate Syren, and Príncipe Real. Foudroyant also transported the Sardinian royal family to Leghorn on 22 September.

On 18 October 1800, an Anglo-Portuguese squadron shared in the capture of the Ragusan polacca Madonna Della Gratia e San Gaetano, which was carrying plate, amongst other cargo.

During the transfer of the Portuguese Court to Brazil in 1807-08, Príncipe Real was the flagship of the Portuguese flotilla.

Fate
Príncipe Real remained in Brazil after Brazil achieved its independence in 1823.

Citations

References

 Marques Esparteiro, Comandante António Marques (1976) Catálogo Dos Navios Brigantinos (1640-1910). (Lisbon: Centro de Estudos de Marinha)

1771 ships
Ships of the line of the Portuguese Navy
Ships of the line of the Brazilian Navy
Ships built in Portugal